Mavrovica (sometimes called Eagle) is an artificial lake built on the river of the same name near the village of Nemanjici, North Macedonia.

Location

Every north of the town of Sveti Nikole, and south of the village of Orel, but still enters the Atar borders of the village of Nemanjici.

Features

Used for watering and water management. The lake is a famous fishing destination, and there are species of fish such as catfish, carp, amur, linden, perch, chub, and red fin, and the most interesting is that there are freshwater jellyfish in the lake. An international fishing carp fishing competition with a bottom hook is also held on the lake shore, catch and release "according to the pattern"

Galery

References

Artificial lakes